James Samuel McDowall (born 6 January 1988) is a New Zealand libertarian politician who was elected to the New Zealand parliament at the 2020 general election as a representative of the ACT New Zealand party.

Political career

Prior to parliament 
McDowall stood for ACT in the Hamilton East electorate in the 2017 general election, but received only 140 votes. He was also placed 13th on the ACT party list, but ACT did not win enough party votes to be entitled to any list MPs.

McDowall led the development of ACT's firearm policy in response to the Government's 2019 Arms Amendment Act.

Election to parliament 
He focused on raising awareness of ACT rather than his own individual electorate. McDowall came third in Waikato, while ACT won 7.6% of the party vote, entitling it to ten MPs including McDowall. During the Commission Opening of the 53rd New Zealand Parliament, McDowall repeated his oath in Cantonese, attracting significant attention – "over a million views" – in Hong Kong. In 2022, he shared on his Facebook that he led the pre-Parliamentary prayer in Cantonese, even garnering praise from Veteran Hong Kong TV host and actor – Patrick Dunn. 

McDowall is the ACT Party's spokesperson for Economic Development, Research, Science and Innovation, Immigration, Defence, and Tourism. As ACT's immigration spokesperson, McDowall has often criticised the Labour government, such as its Covid border policies and their impact on access to seasonal workers, its proposed new "priority" application system and its proposed law changes intended to prevent migrant worker exploitation, but which McDowall said would actually enable bad employers to exploit migrants more. The Green Party's spokesperson, Ricardo Menéndez March, acknowledged the work of McDowall and others to "put immigration on the agenda." McDowall said in 2021 that "ACT would dump Labour’s ‘once in a generation’ immigration reset" and that it "would signal a return to the pre-COVID immigration settings as soon as public health concerns allow".

McDowall supported a law which allowed people to change the gender on their birth certificate. Speaking about the bill, which passed unanimously through parliament, he said it “advanc[ed] liberalism and actually reduc[ed] Government interference in people's lives by enabling choice”.

In November 2022, McDowall was selected as  the ACT Party candidate for the 2022 Hamilton West by-election.

Personal life
McDowall was born in Pukekohe and has a PhD in marketing. He is a small business owner, owning several small businesses including an immigration law firm. He has also worked for the Wise Group, one of the largest providers of mental health and wellbeing services in New Zealand. He has one daughter. McDowall is a vegetarian. He is a Cantonese speaker due to it being his wife's mother tongue.

References

1988 births
Living people
ACT New Zealand MPs
Members of the New Zealand House of Representatives
New Zealand list MPs
University of Waikato alumni
Maastricht University alumni
People from Pukekohe
Unsuccessful candidates in the 2017 New Zealand general election